Bring Me the Head of Yuri Gagarin is a live album by English rock group Hawkwind released in 1985 consisting of a performance at the Empire Pool, Wembley on 27 May 1973. This is a poor sound quality audience recording licensed by Nik Turner. The recording has been released numerous times under different names, with different covers and bundled into box sets.

In 2006, the whole set from the band's performance was issued under the title Empire Pool Wembley 1973, although claimed to be from a different recording source, this also suffers from poor sound quality.

The title is a reference to the 1974 Sam Peckinpah film Bring Me the Head of Alfredo Garcia, as well as Yuri Gagarin, the first human to journey into outer space.

Track listings
Side one
"Gaga" (Dunkley) – 2:10
"In the Egg" (Günter Grass) – 2:38
"Orgone Accumulator" (Calvert/Brock) – 7:25
"Wage War" (Jerzy Kosiński) – 2:49
"Urban Guerilla" (Calvert/Brock) – 6:01

Side two
"Master of the Universe" (Turner/Brock) – 6:53
"Welcome to the Future" (Calvert) – 2:38
"Sonic Attack" (Moorcock) – 3:26
"Silver Machine" (Calvert/Brock) – 3:42

Empire Pool Wembley 1973
"Intro - Andy Dunkley"
"In the Egg"
"Born to Go"
"Down Through the Night"
"Wage War"
"Urban Guerilla"
"Space Is Deep"
"Black Corridor"
"Orgone Accumulator"
"Upside Down"
"Brainstorm"
"Seven by Seven"
"Master of the Universe"
"Welcome to the Future"
"Sonic Attack"
"Silver Machine"

Personnel
Robert Calvert – vocals
Dave Brock – electric guitar, vocals
Nik Turner – saxophone, flute, vocals
Lemmy – bass guitar, vocals
Dik Mik Davies – synthesizer
Del Dettmar – synthesizer
Simon King – drums
Andy Dunkley – introductions
Cover by Nazer Ali Khan

Release history

References

Hawkwind live albums
1985 live albums